The Knötgen automatic rifle is a two barrel automatic rifle of German origin. A machine gun derivative also existed as the Knötgen maschinengewehr.

The Knötgen automatic rifle is a two barrel, magazine fed light machine gun using a delayed blowback operation. It uses two bolts and has a spring buffer and cocking lever in the stock.

See also
 List of machine guns
 List of multiple-barrel firearms

References

1910 establishments in Germany
Automatic rifles
7.92×57mm Mauser machine guns
Light machine guns
Machine guns of Germany
World War I machine guns
World War I German infantry weapons